Felsberg may refer to:

 Felsberg, Hessen, a town in Schwalm-Eder-Kreis, Hessen, Germany
 , a part of Überherrn, Landkreis Saarlouis, Saarland, Germany
 Felsberg (Odenwald), a mountain in the Odenwald hills, Landkreis Bergstraße, Hessen, Germany
 Felsberg, Switzerland, a town in the Grisons, Switzerland
 Felsberg railway station, a Rhaetian Railway station